Eric Wayne Martin (born November 8, 1961) is an American former professional football player who was a wide receiver in the National Football League (NFL). He played college football for the LSU Tigers (1981–1984) and professionally for the New Orleans Saints (1985–1993) and the Kansas City Chiefs (1994).

College
In 1981, Martin went to Louisiana State University (LSU). As a wide receiver for LSU's football team, Martin had 2,625 yards receiving, which at the time was the most career passing yards caught by any receiver in Southeastern Conference (SEC) history. Martin's best season came during his junior year in 1983 when he had 1,064 receiving, which at the time was the 3rd best single-season performance in SEC history. That year, Martin became the first wide receiver in LSU history to be awarded All-American honors. He was also selected to the first-team of the All-SEC Team, becoming the first LSU wide receiver to achieve that feat since Andy Hamilton (first-team All-SEC Team, 1971). As a senior, Martin was again selected to the first-team of the All-SEC Team, becoming the first LSU wide receiver in history to be named twice to the first-team All-SEC Team.

At LSU, Martin's biggest games were No. 12 LSU's 55–21 victory over No. 7 Florida State in 1982 (3 receptions for 121 yards) and LSU's 40–14 victory over No. 9 Washington in 1983 (7 receptions for 137 yards). Martin finished his career at LSU with ten 100-yard-receiving games, including four as a sophomore in 1982 and four as a junior in 1983.

NFL
Martin was taken in the seventh round of the 1985 NFL Draft by the New Orleans Saints. He was the 27th wide receiver taken that year.

Martin played in 10 NFL seasons, from 1985 to 1994. In 1987, he helped lead the Saints to their first playoff appearance in franchise history, only to lose to the Minnesota Vikings 44–10 in the NFC Wildcard. The following year, Martin was a Pro Bowl selection, catching 85 receptions for 1,083 yards and seven touchdowns. After playing 9 years with the Saints, he spent the last year of his career with the Kansas City Chiefs.

Martin is among the Saints franchise leaders in several statistical categories. He ranks second in receptions with 532 behind Marques Colston, third behind Joe Horn and Marques Colston in touchdowns with 48, and second behind Marques Colston in receiving yards with 7,854. He ranks second behind Joe Horn with most 100-yard receiving games with 18.

References

External links
 Database Football

1961 births
Living people
American football wide receivers
Kansas City Chiefs players
LSU Tigers football players
New Orleans Saints players
National Conference Pro Bowl players
People from Matagorda County, Texas
National Football League replacement players